Semmandapatti  is a village panchayat in Vennandur block, Namakkal District

References

Villages in Namakkal district

Vennandur_block